Arimilli Radha Krishna is an Indian politician representing the Telugu Desam Party. He is a former Member of the Legislative Assembly for the  Tanuku (Assembly constituency) constituency, having served from 2014 to 2019.

References 

Andhra Pradesh MLAs 2014–2019
Telugu Desam Party politicians
Telugu politicians
Living people
1973 births